Wurzer is a surname.

People with the surname include:
 Albert Wurzer, German bobsledder
 B. Wurzer, Italian luger
 Cathy Wurzer, American journalist and radio personality
 F. Wurzer, Italian luger
 Georg Wurzer (1907–1982), German football manager